USS LST-749 was an  in the United States Navy. Like many of her class, she was not named and is properly referred to by her hull designation.

Laid down on 10 April 1944 at Pittsburgh, Pennsylvania, by the Dravo Corporation, Neville Island; launched on 20 May 1944; sponsored by Mrs. George W. Scott; and commissioned on 23 June 1944.

Service history
During World War II, LST 749 was assigned to the Pacific theater and participated in the Leyte landings in October and November 1944. On the way to Mindoro, Philippines, in the Sulu Sea, she was struck by a Japanese kamikaze on 21 December 1944. The plane crashed into the bridge of the LST, instantly killing many of the navy personnel on board. The LST floundered and a first attempt at rescue was abandoned for fear of an explosion. Eventually many of the survivors were rescued by the crew of the destroyer . The ship was struck from the Navy list on 19 January 1945.

LST-749 earned one battle star for World War II service.

References

External links
 Edward A. Ferguson WWII correspondence, digital collection at Utah State University

LST-542-class tank landing ships
World War II amphibious warfare vessels of the United States
Ships sunk by kamikaze attack
Ships built in Pittsburgh
1944 ships
Maritime incidents in December 1944
Ships built by Dravo Corporation